Wasusiwakit Phusirit (born June 27, 1992) is a Thai professional footballer who plays as a right-back for Thai League 2 club Rayong. In the 2020/2021 season he started 25 games for Rayong FC.

References

External links
 at Soccerway

1992 births
Living people
Wasusiwakit Phusirit
Wasusiwakit Phusirit
Association football defenders
Wasusiwakit Phusirit
Wasusiwakit Phusirit